UK charts may refer to

 UK Albums Chart
 UK Dance Chart
 UK Official Download Chart
 UK R&B Chart
 UK Rock Chart
 UK Singles Chart records
 UK Classical Chart
 UK Indie Chart
 UK Music Charts
 UK Progressive Albums Chart 
 UK Singles Chart